High and Handsome is a 1925 American silent drama film directed by Harry Garson and starring Maurice 'Lefty' Flynn, Ethel Shannon, and Tom Kennedy.

Plot
As described in a film magazine reviews, Joe Hanrahan, policeman, rescues Marie Le Doux’s Persian cat from a perch on a telegraph pole and also falls in love with Marie. Battling Kennedy is a prize fighter who also loves Marie and Joe retires in his favor. Joe in the discharge of his duty warns Kennedy’s manager, Tom Burke, against holding any more fights in his arena until the balcony is repaired. He tries to bribe Joe into overlooking this matter and Joe refuses the money. Kennedy slurs Marie and Joe gives him a beating. Word is sent to headquarters that Joe has fought a citizen and his badge is taken from him. When Burke announces that he is looking for someone to fight Kennedy, Joe appears and accepts the challenge. During the fight, in which he whips Kennedy, the balcony falls and several persons are injured. Joe, who has been reinstated, arrests Burke. He also wins the affection of Marie.

Cast

References

Bibliography
 Munden, Kenneth White. The American Film Institute Catalog of Motion Pictures Produced in the United States, Part 1. University of California Press, 1997.

External links
 

1925 films
1925 drama films
1920s English-language films
American silent feature films
Silent American drama films
Films directed by Harry Garson
American black-and-white films
Film Booking Offices of America films
1920s American films